Alan Hagman (January 11, 1964 – November 11, 2019) was an American photojournalist for the Los Angeles Times from 1987 to his death. He covered many topics, including the Mexican Drug War.

References

1964 births
2019 deaths
People from Fort Wayne, Indiana
People from Long Beach, California
University of Kansas alumni
Photographers from California
Photographers from Indiana
American photojournalists
Los Angeles Times people
20th-century American photographers
21st-century American photographers